Gudrun Scholz née Scheller (born 14 January 1940) is a retired German field hockey player.

Scholz joined Eintracht Braunschweig in 1952, initially competing as a long jumper. In 1959 she set a German record at 6.22m. In 1961, Scholz placed third in the long jump competition at the German Athletics Championships.

In the early 1960s, she joined Eintracht Braunschweig's field hockey team. With her club, she won nine German championship titles. She also played 30 games in total for the West German national team.

With West Germany, Scholz won the 1976 Women's Hockey World Cup. She scored both goals in the final, a 2–0 win over Argentina.

In 1977, Scholz was awarded the Silbernes Lorbeerblatt and the Paul-Reinberg-Plakette, the highest award of the German Hockey Federation. In 1988, she was inducted into the hall of fame of the Lower Saxon Institute of Sports History.

References 

1940 births
Living people
German female field hockey players
West German female long jumpers
Sportspeople from Braunschweig
Recipients of the Silver Laurel Leaf